Heredia is a surname originating in a place-name. One such surname is Basque, derived from the village Heredia in Álava, Basque Country.  Another form seems be related to a root derived from Old Danish and Old Swedish Erik and Eirikr. It is listed in the Domesday Book of 1086.

Name variations include: Eiric, Eric, Erish, Herrick, Herricke, de Herédia, de Heredia, etc., as well as some reference to ancient Roman etymology for heredium, singular of Heredia (etymology). An examination of early immigration records and passenger ship lists revealed that people bearing the name Heredia arrived in the Americas quite early. The earliest origin is yet to be published.

The following people have the surname:
 Castro Curvelo de Herédia (November 1966), also known as D. Isabel, Duchess of Braganza, Princess Royal of Portugal, noblewoman, and the wife of Duarte Pio, Duke of Braganza, the defunct Portuguese throne. Born to descendants of Portuguese peerage (see: Portuguese nobility).
 Alberto Heredia Ceballos (born 1987), Spanish soccer player
 Alonso Fernández de Heredia (died 1782), Spanish general and politician
 Ángel Guillermo Heredia Hernández (born 1975), Mexican sports coach and former discus thrower
 Arnold Heredia (born 1940), Pakistani Catholic priest and human rights activist
 Carlos María de Heredia, Mexican critical thinker, author of Spiritism and Common Sense (1922), and friend of magician Harry Houdini
 Cayetano Heredia (1797–1861), Peruvian physician
 Daniel Heredia Abidal (born 1993), Spanish singer
 Enrique Fernández Heredia (fl. 1900s), Spanish military commander
 Fernando Martínez Heredia (born 1939), Cuban politician
 Gil Heredia (born 1965), American baseball player
 Guillermo Heredia (baseball) (born 1991), Cuban baseball player
 José-Maria de Heredia (1842–1905), French poet
 José María Heredia y Heredia (1803–1839), Cuban poet and political activist
 Juan Fernández de Heredia (c. 1310–1396), Aragonese historian
 Manual Heredia, 1832, a Spanish pioneer and businessman, Heredia company constructed the first charcoal-fired blast furnace for non-military purposes in Spain.
 Pedro de Heredia (died 1554), Spanish conquistador
 Sebastiano Aguilera de Heredia (1561–1627), Spanish composer and monk
 Ubaldo Heredia (born 1956), Venezuelan baseball player

References 

Basque-language surnames
Spanish-language surnames